The Dafengding Nature Reserve is located in Meigu County, Liangshan Yi Autonomous Prefecture, and in the Mabian Yi Autonomous County in Leshan prefecture-level city, both in Sichuan Province in the People's Republic of China.

 Elevation: 1240 – 3835 meters (Meigu reserve); 1200–4042 meters (Mabian reserve)
 Area: 159.50 sq. kilometers (Meigu reserve); 301.46 sq. kilometers (Mabian reserve)
 Established: 1978

The southernmost population of pandas live in this area. Beside the giant panda, fauna in the reserve include:

 red panda
 Asiatic black bears
 blue sheep
 giant salamander 
 golden monkey
 goral
 leopard
 clouded leopard
 macaque
 muntjac
 sambar

References

External links
 China Species Information Service - Meigu reserve
 CSIS - Mabian reserve
 Giant panda tour

Nature reserves in China
Liangshan Yi Autonomous Prefecture
Nature reserves of Sichuan
Tourist attractions in Sichuan